The peninsula brown snake (Pseudonaja inframacula) is a species of venomous elapid snake native to South Australia.

References

Pseudonaja
Snakes of Australia
Reptiles described in 1925